The Tampa Bay Bandits were  a professional American football team based in Tampa, Florida, The Bandits competed in the United States Football League (USFL) as a member club of the league's South division, prior to going on hiatus after the season. The team played their 2022 home games at Protective Stadium and Legion Field in Birmingham, Alabama, which also hosts the University of Alabama at Birmingham Blazers.

History 
The Tampa Bay Bandits were one of eight teams that were officially announced as a USFL franchise on The Herd with Colin Cowherd on November 22, 2021.

On January 6, 2022, it was announced on The Herd with Colin Cowherd that former Kansas City Chiefs head coach Todd Haley was named the head coach and general manager for the Bandits.

On November 15, 2022, it was announced that the Tampa Bay Bandits would not play during the 2023 season and would instead be on a temporary hiatus. This came with the announcement of the creation of the Memphis Showboats. The players and coaches on the existing Bandits team were transferred to the Showboats.

Personnel

Final roster 
Initially, each team carried a 38-man active roster and a 7-man practice squad, but the rosters were increased to 40 active players and 50 total in May, 2022.

Final staff

Statistics and records

Season-by-season record

Note: The Finish, Wins, Losses, and Ties columns list regular season results and exclude any postseason play.

Records

References

2021 establishments in Alabama
American football teams established in 2021
Tampa Bay Bandits (2022)
American football teams in Birmingham, Alabama
United States Football League (2022) teams